"Slow Poison" is the second television play episode of the second season of the Australian anthology television series Australian Playhouse. "Slow Poison" was produced in Melbourne by Oscar Whitbread, written by Allan Trevor. and originally aired on ABC on 22 April 1967, 19 June 1967 in Melbourne and 31 July 1967 in Canberra>.

Plot
A columnist Tim Douglas loses his job and friends.

Cast
 Ray Taylor as Tim Douglas
 Brian James
 Dennis Clinton
 Clive Winmill
 Keith Eden
 Kurt Bleiman

Reception
The Age said it had "a well developed central character" where "Allan Trevor produced a workmanlike script and Oscar Whitbread treated it well with some light touches."

Another viewer from the same paper said it "went septic in the production department and fell on its face elsewhere. Ray Taylor was less than impressive... We know we have good actors and producers... but where are the dramatists?"

See also
 List of television plays broadcast on Australian Broadcasting Corporation (1960s)

References

External links
 

1967 television plays
1967 Australian television episodes
1960s Australian television plays
Australian Playhouse (season 2) episodes